The 2013–14 Kerala Premier League Season was the inaugural season of the Kerala Premier League, a professional football league played in Kerala, India.

The tournament had kicked off in March, but due to the elections and then rains the 2013–14 Kerala Premier League became a long drawn affair. The preliminary round Group A of the Kerala Premier League was played between 15 and 23 March with Eagles FC beating AG's Office from Thiruvananthapuram in the final 3–1, but both teams progressed to the final round in which they await the top two teams from Group B. Eagles FC and AG's Office, Thiruvananthapuram had qualified from Group A; while State Bank of Travancore and Kerala XI had made it from Group B into the semifinals of the competition. Eagles FC are the champions of the Kerala Premier League after beating State Bank of Travancore 3–1 in the final of the championship on Monday, 26 May.

Teams

Group stage
Group A

Group B

Matches
Group A

Group B

Semifinals

Finals

References

Kerala Premier League seasons
3